Patricio Walker Prieto (born 28 April 1969) is a Chilean politician. He was President of the Senate between 11 March 2015 and 15 March 2016. He was member of the Senate between 2010 and 2018. From 2007 to 2008 Walker was President of the Chamber of Deputies of Chile. He was member of the Chamber of Deputies between 1998 and 2010. Walker is member of the Christian Democratic Party.

Career
Walker was born on 28 April 1969 in Santiago to Ignacio Joaquín Walker Concha and Isabel Margarita Prieto Vial. He had his primary education at the Colegio San Ignacio in Santiagio between 1974 and 1983. He followed his secondary education at the Colegio Pontificio Seminario Menor from 1984 to 1987. The next year he became a law student at Diego Portales University where he obtained a degree in 1994.

In the parliamentary elections of 1997, 2001 and 2005 Walker was elected for the Christian Democratic Party to the Chamber of Deputies for District 8 of the Coquimbo Region. Walker served as fraction leader of the Christian Democratic Party from 2002 to 2003. Between March 2007 and March 2008 Walker was President of the Chamber of Deputies.

In the parliamentary elections of 2009 Walker was elected Senator for the 18th Circunscription of Aysén. He was elected President of the Senate on 11 March 2015. He obtained 23 out of 38 votes and succeeded Isabel Allende.

In July 2015 Walker spoke out against a possible return to compulsory voting in Chile, calling the remedy possibly worse than the problem. Walker travelled to Venezuela for the 2015 parliamentary elections as an observer. He spoke with Lilian Tintori, wife of imprisoned politician Leopoldo López. Walker supported the couple and stated there was no crime and fraudulent evidence.

Walker was succeeded as President of the Senate on 15 March 2016 by Ricardo Lagos Weber. Walker decided not to run in the 2017 Chilean general election and his term in office ended on 18 March 2018.

Personal life
Walker is married and has three children. He has eight siblings, including politicians Ignacio Walker and Matías Walker.

References

1969 births
Living people
Christian Democratic Party (Chile) politicians
Diego Portales University alumni
Members of the Chamber of Deputies of Chile
Members of the Senate of Chile
Politicians from Santiago
Presidents of the Chamber of Deputies of Chile
Presidents of the Senate of Chile
Chilean people of English descent